Beitar Pardes Katz,, was an Israeli football club based in Pardes Katz neighborhood of Bnei Brak.

History
The club was founded in 1982 by amateur footballers and played during its entire existence in the lower leagues of the Israeli football league system, its best achievement being playing in Liga Bet for one season during the 1986–87 season. In 1985–86 the club, while playing in Liga Gimel, reached the 8th round of the cup, after beating Hapoel Majd al-Krum 2 – 1 in the seventh round. The club played Maccabi Tel Aviv in the 8th round and was beaten 0–5.

The club folded at the end of the 2006–07 season. Another club was established in Pardes Katz in 2012, Maccabi Pardes Katz.

External links
Beitar Pardes Katz The Israel Football Association

References

Pardes Katz
Pardes Katz
Association football clubs established in 1982
Association football clubs disestablished in 2007
1982 establishments in Israel
2007 disestablishments in Israel
Pardes Katz Beitar